Morarji Desai Residential Schools for Minorities are the schools in Karnataka state in India. These are run by Directorate of Minorities department of the Government of Karnataka. The schools are set up to provide free residential education from Grade 6 to 10 to the students from minority communities.
To promote educational levels by increasing enrolment and retention and to bring down drop-out rate with greater focus on quality education Morarji Desai Residential Schools are opened and are in function across Karnataka for 6th to 10th Std students. There are 64 Morarji Desai Residential Schools, 4 Minority Model Residential School, 9 Pre University residential colleges & 5 Muslim residential Schools running under this directorate. These are named after former prime minister of India Morarji Desai.
The facilities provided in these Morarji Desai Residential Schools are:-
1. Boarding facilities for each student at the rate of Rs. 1400/- per month for 10 months.
2. Free Accommodation.
3. Free Uniform, Shoes & Socks.
4. Free Text Books & Stationery.
5. Free other Facilities.

References

Boarding schools in Karnataka
Minorities-focussed government initiatives in India
Morarji Desai